AS Inur Transforma is a football club timorese based in Díli. The team plays in the Liga Futebol Amadora Terceira Divisão.

Competition records

Liga Futebol Amadora 
LFA Terceira 2019: 3rd place in Groub A

References

Football clubs in East Timor
Football
Association football clubs established in 2019